Yakub Khan (3 April 1903 – 24 August 1958), known as Yakub, was an Indian actor born into a Pathan family in Jabalpur, Madhya Pradesh, India. He is best known for his comic and comic villainous roles.
He began his career with roles as an extra, but eventually was cast in more important roles, frequently playing the parts of heroes and villains. He became one of the most renowned screen villains, while achieving equal success in comedy and character roles. Yakub appeared in over 100 films.

Early life 

Yakub ran away from home at an early age, and performed odd jobs, such as a motor mechanic and table waiter, before joining the crew of the ship S.S. Madura as a kitchen worker. He left the ship after travelling to various places, like London, Brussels and Paris, then returned to Calcutta, where he worked as a tourist guide, among other jobs. Around 1924, he moved to Bombay (now Mumbai) and joined the Sharda Film Company.

Career 

During his travels, Yakub watched american films, and became greatly influenced by Eddie Polo, Douglas Fairbanks Sr., Wallace Beery and later by Humphrey Bogart. Yakub's first film was the silent film Bajirao Mastani (1925), which starred Master Vithal. While his first talkie was Meri Jaan (1931), where he played the title role of the Prince. This film has also been credited as Romantic Prince. His portrayal of Briju in Aurat (1940) was well received and his acting in this film is considered one of the finest performances in the Indian Cinema. Yakub's popularity in those days can be gauged by the credit roll of films such as the S K Ojha directed Hulchul (1951), which had a star cast of Dilip Kumar, Nargis and Sitara Devi, where his name was credited as '…and your favourite, Yakub'.

Yakub was an "acknowledged master of comedy" along with other actors such as Johnny Walker, Gope and Agha,  according to the B. K. Karanjia co-edited book; Genres of Indian Cinema. His comic pairing with Gope and Agha was so well liked by the audiences, that they all appeared in multiple films together. For example Sagai (1951), Patanga (1949) and Beqasoor (1950) .  Yakub was one of the highest paid actors from 1930 to early 1950.

Director 

Yakub directed three films; Sagar Ka Sher and Uski Tamanna in the 1930s, and Aiye in 1949. Sagar Ka Sher or Lion of Sagar, was the first film he directed in 1937 under the Sagar Movietone banner. His co-stars in this film were; Bibbo, Pesi Patel, Sankatha Prasad, Raja Mehdi and David. Uski Tamanna also known as Her Last Desire was made in 1939 under Sagar and directed by Yakub. The film starred Yakub, Maya, Bhudo Advani, Kaushalya, Sankatha Prasad, Satish and Putli.  
He directed his third and last movie, Aiye, in 1949 under the Indian Production banner. It had Sulochana Chatterjee, Masud, Jankidas, Sheela Naik, and Ashraf Khan along with Yakub. The music in this film was composed by Nashad (Shaukat Dehlvi) and was Mubarak Begum's first film as a playback singer. Yakub's second cousin Allaudin was the song recordist for this film. However, he lost money on this film and called it the biggest mistake of his life.
When Mehmood was a struggling artist, he would hang around Bombay Talkies waiting for Yakub to arrive. Yakub knowing his financial state would give him one or two rupees in the form of loose change.
Yakub was a deeply religious person and was called Maulana by his friends.

Death 
Yakub died in Bombay, Maharashtra, India, on 24 August 1958, at the age of 55 years.

Filmography 

Yakub acted in over 100 films in a career covering 34 years. A brief filmography is listed.

References

External links 
 

Indian male film actors
1958 deaths
1904 births
Male actors in Hindi cinema
20th-century Indian male actors
Male actors from Madhya Pradesh
Indian people of Pashtun descent
People from Jabalpur